John Thomas Roberts (8 February 1881 – 10 January 1956) was an Australian rules footballer who played with South Melbourne in the Victorian Football League (VFL).

Notes

External links 

1881 births
1956 deaths
Sydney Swans players
Australian rules footballers from Victoria (Australia)